Plum Point is a local service district and designated place in the Canadian province of Newfoundland and Labrador. It is west of Anchor Point.

History 

The original name Ferrol Zaharra was given by the Basque fishermen and been translated in English later on. The former name of Old Ferrole was changed on June 11, 1965.

Geography 
Plum Point is in Newfoundland within Subdivision C of Division No. 9.

Demographics 

Government 
Plum Point is a local service district (LSD) that is governed by a committee responsible for the provision of certain services to the community. The chair of the LSD committee is Ben Coombs.

See also 
Great Northern Peninsula
List of designated places in Newfoundland and Labrador
List of local service districts in Newfoundland and Labrador
Newfoundland and Labrador Route 432

References 

Populated coastal places in Canada
Designated places in Newfoundland and Labrador
Local service districts in Newfoundland and Labrador